List of Guggenheim Fellowships awarded in 1934. Forty scholars and artists received fellowships.

1934 U.S. and Canadian Fellows

1934 Latin American and Caribbean Fellows

See also
 Guggenheim Fellowship
 List of Guggenheim Fellowships awarded in 1933
 List of Guggenheim Fellowships awarded in 1935

References

1934
1934 awards